The following is a chronological list of recordings and performances of songs written by Jimmy Webb.

References

 
Webb, Jimmy